Arizal is a village in Budgam district in Indian Jammu and Kashmir. It is situated at the base of the Pir Panjal Range of the Himalayas, in the Sukhnag Valley. It falls under the administrative division of tehsil Khansahib, which is one of the nine tehsils of district Budgam.

At the 2011 census, it had a population of 1,715.

Demographics

Population 
As of 2011 census, the population of Arizal is 1715 of which 874 (51%) are males while the remaining 841 (49%) are females and a total number of 467 children (217 boys and 250 girls) below 6 years as per the report. There are about 252 houses in Arizal village.

Religion 

People in all the hamlets of Arizal follow Islam and the whole of the population of Arizal belong to Sunni sect of Islam. Most of the people of the village follows the Hanafi School Of Thought. However Rising Tendency towards Salafi School Of Thought Can't be Underestimated. Religious education is imparted through Madrasas either early in the morning or in the evening time.
Ghulam Ali Malik is the Imam (Religious head) of the village.

See also 
 Rathsoon
 Aripanthan
 Beerwah, Jammu and Kashmir
 Ohangam
Sonapah
Wanihama
Meerpora
Kandour
Chewdara

References

Villages in Budgam district